Ulken-Karoy or Ulken Karaoy, meaning "Big Karoy" (or Большой Карой —Bolshoy Karoy), is a salt lake in Akzhar District, North Kazakhstan Region, Kazakhstan.

The nearest inhabited localities are Kulykol and Talshik.

Geography
Lying in the southern part of the Ishim Plain, south of the Russian border, Ulken-Karoy is one of the main lakes of the region. It is an endorheic lake sharing the same depression as lakes Teke in the east and Kishi-Karoy in the west. The lake is shallow and its bottom is muddy. The shores are flat. In years of drought Ulken-Karoy almost completely dries up and its water surface may decline to barely .
An enormous island occupies the middle of the lake. It is joined to the mainland in its southern part, except during periods of high water. In such periods the water of the lake becomes fresh.

Ulken-Karoy lake is surrounded by a strip of salt marshes. The Ashchisu and Karasu are the main rivers flowing into the lake.

See also
List of lakes of Kazakhstan

References

External links

Expeditions along the watersheds of the middle forest-steppe of the Omsk region (in Russian)
ИНТЕЛЛЕКТУАЛЬНАЯ НАЦИЯ В ФОКУСЕ ГУМАНИТАРНЫХ ТЕХНОЛОГИЙ (in Russian)

Lakes of Kazakhstan
Endorheic lakes of Asia
North Kazakhstan Region
West Siberian Plain